Love Sex Passion is the fifth studio album by American R&B recording artist Raheem DeVaughn. The album was released on February 17, 2015, by 368 Music Group and E1 Music.

Commercial performance
The album debuted at number 31 on the Billboard 200 chart, with first-week sales of 13,000 copies in the United States.

Track listing

Notes
 signifies a co-producer.

Charts

Weekly charts

Year-end charts

References

2015 albums
Raheem DeVaughn albums